"Burning Heart" is a song by Survivor. It appeared in the 1985 film Rocky IV and on its soundtrack album; the film's star Sylvester Stallone personally commissioned the song. The single peaked at number 2 on the Billboard Hot 100 for two weeks in February 1986, behind "That's What Friends Are For" by Dionne and Friends. It was the biggest hit the band had with Jimi Jamison on lead vocals.  It was also a top 5 hit in the UK, Germany and several other European countries, and reached the top 15 in Canada.

Content
"Burning Heart", which is about an "all or nothing" battle, was inspired by the Cold War, as shown by lyrics such as "Is it East versus West?" and "Can any nation stand alone?" The Communist East versus Capitalist West conflict is reflected in the film by the fight in the boxing ring between Rocky and Ivan Drago.

The final solo and tremolo bar solos in the middle of the song were played with a Fender Stratocaster.

Other appearances
The song was used on the final episode of HBO's 24/7 documentary on the 2011 NHL Winter Classic. The song was used to describe the hype and East vs. West feel surrounding the Washington Capitals' Russian superstar Alexander Ovechkin, and the Pittsburgh Penguins' Canadian superstar Sidney Crosby, who were the focus of attention heading into the Winter Classic. The song was also used in the sixth episode of the third season of Netflix original series, Santa Clarita Diet, "The Chicken and the Pear" as well as the fifth episode of the fourth season of Cobra Kai, "Match Point".

The song is featured in the enhanced versions of the 2013 game Grand Theft Auto V on the in-game radio station, Los Santos Rock Radio.

Music video
The music video for "Burning Heart" features Survivor giving a concert, mixed with scenes from the film Rocky IV. A version with only the band (no movie footage) also exists, available on YouTube.

Track listings
 7" single
 "Burning Heart" – 3:51
 "Feels Like Love" – 3:20

 12" maxi
 "Burning Heart" – 3:51
 "Eye of the Tiger" – 3:46
 "Feels Like Love" – 3:20

Charts and sales

Weekly charts

Year-end charts

Certifications and sales

Cover versions
1999: Jimi Jamison released a live version of "Burning Heart" on his album Empires.
2003: Seventh Avenue

References

1985 songs
1986 singles
Survivor (band) songs
European Hot 100 Singles number-one singles
Number-one singles in Switzerland
Ultratop 50 Singles (Flanders) number-one singles
Songs from Rocky (film series)
Songs written by Frankie Sullivan
Songs written by Jim Peterik
Hard rock ballads
Scotti Brothers Records singles
Cold War in popular culture
Boxing music